(or Nieder Leuten) is a municipality and village in Karviná District in the Moravian-Silesian Region of the Czech Republic. It has about 5,200 inhabitants.

Administrative parts

The village of Věřňovice is an administrative part of Dolní Lutyně.

Geography
Dolní Lutyně lies on the border with Poland in the historical region of Cieszyn Silesia. The border is partly formed by the Olza River. The municipality is situated in the Ostrava Basin. There are several ponds and an artificial lake created by flooding a sand quarry.

In the area around the Olza there are riparian forests with two natural monuments, Věřňovice and Niva Olše – Věřňovice.

History
The village could have been founded by Benedictine monks from an Orlová monastery and also it could a part of a larger settlement campaign taking place in the late 13th century on the territory of what will be later known as Upper Silesia. The first written mention of Lutyně is in a Latin document of Diocese of Wrocław called Liber fundationis episcopatus Vratislaviensis from 1305 as Luthina.

Politically the village belonged initially to the Duchy of Teschen, a fee of Kingdom of Bohemia, which after 1526 became part of the Habsburg monarchy.

The large village was later in the 14th century subdivided into two sister settlements. Dolní Lutyně was then known for centuries as "German" (Theutonicum), and the other as "Polish" (Polonicum), now known as Lutyně within Orlová. In 1450 they were together mentioned as Lutynie utrumque Theutonicum et Polonicum.

German Lutyně became a seat of a Catholic parish, mentioned in the register of Peter's Pence payment from 1447 among 50 parishes of Teschen deaconry as Lutina.

From 1700, Lutyně was a property of Taaffe counts who built there a baroque castle as their summer residence. In 1792, Lutyně was acquired by the Moennich family. They used the coal presence for the economic development of the region.

After World War I, Polish–Czechoslovak War and the division of Cieszyn Silesia in 1920, the village became a part of Czechoslovakia. Following the Munich Agreement, in October 1938 together with the Zaolzie region it was annexed by Poland, administratively organised in Frysztat County of Silesian Voivodeship. The village was then annexed by Nazi Germany at the beginning of World War II. After the war it was restored to Czechoslovakia.

Demographics
As of census 2021, the Polish minority made up 3.7% of the population.

Sights

The Catholic Church of Saint John the Baptist was built in the Baroque style in 1740–1746 and replaced an old wooden church. The appearance of the original church with a statue of St. John of Nepomuk, which is older than the new church, has been preserved. In the bell tower is a rare Renaissance bell from the late 15th or early 16th century.

A historical monument is a preserved barn from 1805.

The former Baroque castle is only partially preserved and is in a desolate state.

Notable people
Rudolf Paszek (1894–1969), Polish teacher and politician

Twin towns – sister cities

Dolní Lutyně is twinned with:
 Godów, Poland
 Gorzyce, Poland

References

External links

 

Villages in Karviná District
Cieszyn Silesia